AUAF may refer to:

 American University of Afghanistan (or AUoA)
 Assyrian Universal Alliance Foundation, a non-profit organization in Chicago